Military necessity, along with distinction, and proportionality, are three important principles of international humanitarian law governing the legal use of force in an armed conflict.

Attacks
Military necessity is governed by several constraints: an attack or action must be intended to help in the military defeat of the enemy; it must be an attack on a military objective, and the harm caused to civilians or civilian property must be proportional and not "excessive in relation to the concrete and direct military advantage anticipated".

Luis Moreno-Ocampo, Chief Prosecutor at the International Criminal Court, investigated allegations of war crimes during the 2003 invasion of Iraq and he published an open letter containing his findings. In a section titled "Allegations concerning War Crimes " he did not call it military necessity but summed up the term:

The judgement of a field commander in battle over military necessity and proportionality is rarely subject to domestic or international legal challenge unless the methods of warfare used by the commander were illegal, as for example was the case with Radislav Krstic who was found guilty as an aider and abettor to genocide by International Criminal Tribunal for the former Yugoslavia for the Srebrenica massacre.

Weapons
Military necessity also applies to weapons, particularly when a new weapon is developed and deployed. This usage was considered in Ryuichi Shimoda et al. v. The State (1963):

See also
 Civilian casualty ratio

References
. See section "Allegations concerning War Crimes" Pages 4,5
Ryuichi Shimoda et al. v. The State (1963)

Further reading

Footnotes

Law of war